Sir Thomas Herbert Warren, KCVO (21 October 1853 – 9 June 1930) was a British academic and administrator who was president of Magdalen College, Oxford for 43 years (1885–1928) and vice-chancellor of Oxford University (1906–10).

Early life and education

Warren was born in Bristol, the eldest son of magistrate Algernon William Warren, and Cecil Thomas, both born in Carmarthenshire, Wales. Architect Edward Prioleau Warren was his younger brother. His sister, Anna Letitia Warren, studied at Somerville College, Oxford.
At age 15, he entered the newly opened Clifton College, under its first headmaster John Percival. At Clifton, he played rugby and became head boy.

After earning a scholarship, Warren entered Balliol College, Oxford, in 1872. He excelled as a scholar, earning numerous classical distinctions, including firsts in Moderations and Lit. Hum., the Hertford and Craven Scholarships, and the Gaisford Prize for Greek Verse (1875). He was the college librarian in 1875-6. He also played rugby for the college and the university. He was elected a Fellow of Magdalen in 1877, and became Classical Tutor in 1878.

Career

Warren was president of Magdalen College, Oxford, from 1885–1928, and served as vice-chancellor of Oxford University from 1906–10 and as Oxford Professor of Poetry 1911–16.

Warren published By Severn Sea and Other Poems in 1897  an The Death of Virgil in 1907. In 1913, he published a study of his friend, the poet Robert Bridges.

He retired in 1918 after spending  more than four decades as a significant figure at the university.

Honours

Warren was appointed a Knight Commander of the Royal Victorian Order in 1914 after the Prince of Wales left Magdalen.

He earned honorary degrees of LL.D. from the University of Birmingham  and D.Litt. from the University of Bristol. He was made an honorary D.C.L. at Oxford. He also received the Legion of Honour from France and the Order of the Crown of Italy.

Personal life
In 1886, Warren married Mary Isabel Brodie, youngest daughter of Sir Benjamin Collins Brodie, 2nd Baronet.

He died in 1930 in Oxford and was buried at Holywell Cemetery.

References

External links
 Photographs in the National Portrait Gallery (London)
 Warren, Sir Thomas Herbert (1853–1930) Knight, President of Magdalen College Oxford, Janus, University of Cambridge, UK 
 Warren, Sir Thomas Herbert (1853–1930) Knight President of Magdalen College Oxford, National Archives, UK

1853 births
1930 deaths
People educated at Clifton College
Alumni of Balliol College, Oxford
Fellows of Balliol College, Oxford
Knights Commander of the Royal Victorian Order
Presidents of Magdalen College, Oxford
Vice-Chancellors of the University of Oxford
Oxford Professors of Poetry
English male poets
Burials at Holywell Cemetery